St Thomas Historical Trust (also Saint Thomas Historical Trust), is a non-profit  located on Saint Thomas island, in the United States Virgin Islands.

Programs
The Trust's headquarters and history museum are located in the Roosevelt Park area of Charlotte Amalie on St. Thomas. The Trust works to preserve the cultural and historical heritage of Saint Thomas, through education, advocacy, and preservation promotion.

It has an ongoing program of historical and cultural events, including lectures, walking tours, practical projects and activities for children. It also organises initiatives to celebrate traditions of the islanders and raises funds for future preservation work.

History 
The Trust was established in 1966 as a non-profit organization.   Early projects included involvement in the archeological site on Tutu island.

The Trust has since been involved in numerous preservation, restoration, and outreach projects, including the Hassel Island Historic District on Hassel Island, the Bred Gade step streets of Charlotte Amalie, and the Danish colonial Fort Christian.

See also

References

External links 

Saint Thomas Historical Trust Facebook page

Saint Thomas, U.S. Virgin Islands
History of the United States Virgin Islands
Historic preservation organizations in the United States
Danish West Indies
1966 establishments in the United States Virgin Islands